Monrosia is a genus of flowering plants belonging to the family Polygalaceae, with the sole species Monrosia pterolopha, native to northwest Argentina.

References

Polygalaceae
Fabales genera